The 1973–74 WHA season was the second season of the World Hockey Association. Twelve teams each played 78 games. The Philadelphia Blazers relocated to Vancouver, becoming the Vancouver Blazers. They were moved to the Western Division and Chicago moved to the East. The New York Raiders were renamed the New York Golden Blades and then moved to Cherry Hill, New Jersey to become the Jersey Knights after just 24 games. The Ottawa Nationals moved to Toronto and became the Toronto Toros. The Alberta Oilers changed their name to the Edmonton Oilers.

Regular season

Final standings
GP = Games Played, W = Wins, L = Losses, T = Ties, Pts = Points, GF = Goals for, GA = Goals against, PIM = Penalties in minutes

Teams that qualifies for the playoffs are highlighted in bold

Summary
In June of 1973, the Houston Aeros lured 45-year-old Gordie Howe out of retirement by promising him that he could play with his sons Mark and Marty who were also on the team. Howe responded by having a 100-point season, leading the team in scoring and helping them finish with the best record in the league. The Aeros also received excellent goaltending from Don McLeod and Wayne Rutledge. 

The defending Western Division champion Winnipeg Jets slipped to 4th place with a sub-.500 record. The other playoff qualifiers in the West were Minnesota and Edmonton. In the East, defending Avco World Trophy champions New England won their second straight division title followed by Toronto, Cleveland, and Chicago.

Player stats

Scoring leaders
Bolded numbers indicate season leaders

GP = Games played; G = Goals; A = Assists; Pts = Points; PIM = Penalty minutes

Leading goaltenders 
Bolded numbers indicate season leaders

GP = Games played; Min = Minutes played; W = Wins; L = Losses; T = Ties, GA = Goals against; GA = Goals against; SO = Shutouts; SV% = Save percentage; GAA = Goals against average

All-Star Game
At St. Paul Civic Center in St. Paul, MN, the East defeated the West 8-4.

Avco World Trophy playoffs
The West Division playoffs went according to form, with the top two seeds, Houston and Minnesota, easily disposing of Edmonton and Winnipeg respectively. In the east, Toronto won as expected over Cleveland, but Chicago shocked the WHA by upsetting the defending champion New England Whalers in seven games, winning three of the four games in New England. In the division finals, favored Houston defeated Minnesota in six games, while Chicago pulled its second upset by beating Toronto in seven games, outscoring the Toros 14-4 in winning games six and seven.  They ran out of magic in the finals however, as Houston swept them in four straight, outscoring them 22-9.

WHA awards

Trophies

All-Star Team

See also
1973 WHA Amateur Draft
List of NHL seasons
List of pre-NHL seasons
1973 in sports
1974 in sports

References

HockeyDB

 
2
2
World Hockey Association seasons